Joseph John Sayers (born 5 November 1983) is a former English first-class cricketer, who has played for the Oxford University Centre of Cricketing Excellence, Oxford University and Yorkshire. He is a left-handed opening batsman and right arm off spin bowler. Sayers was educated at St Mary's School, Menston, and Worcester College, Oxford.

Early career
Sayers hit his sixth first-class century, coming off 318 balls and taking over six and a half hours, against Durham at Headingley in the opening home fixture of the 2007 season, as he carried his bat through the first innings, hitting a then personal best score of 149 not out. In June 2007, he surpassed this score against Kent at the Nevill Ground, Royal Tunbridge Wells, scoring 187. Sayers played club cricket for Hoylandswaine Cricket Club in the Huddersfield Premier League. His first-class career with Yorkshire commenced in 2004.

England Lions
On 15 August 2009, Sayers replaced Jonathan Trott in the England Lions squad for the tour match against Australia before the fifth Ashes Test match.

Illness
In 2010, Sayers was diagnosed with post-viral fatigue syndrome. It meant that his season was over before it had really started, and whilst his playing colleagues made a serious attempt at the County Championship title, Sayers was hardly able to walk at home. His recovery led to him being picked for action in the less successful 2011 campaign.

Recent times
In 2012, Sayers signed a new two-year contract with Yorkshire, although he had slipped from regular first team duties.
He has since then turned his hand to writing with Rose-tinted Summer.

References

External links
Cricket Online Profile

1983 births
Living people
Cricketers from Leeds
English cricketers
Yorkshire cricketers
Oxford University cricketers
Oxford MCCU cricketers
People educated at St. Mary's Catholic High School, Menston
Alumni of Worcester College, Oxford